is a Japanese professional basketball player.  he plays for the Kawasaki Brave Thunders of the B.League.

He has been a member of Japan's national basketball team on many occasions. At the 2016 FIBA World Olympic Qualifying Tournament – Belgrade, he was Japan's top scorer.

Flagrant foul
He was disqualified from the B.League game at Toyama City Gymnasium for punching Grouses' Satoru Maeta on December 25, 2019.

Career statistics

Regular season 

|-
| align="left" | 2012-13
| align="left" | Toshiba
| 42|| || 27.9|| .401|| .366|| .800|| 2.1|| 2.9|| 0.7|| 0.1|| 11.7
|-
| align="left" | 2013-14
| align="left" | Toshiba
| 54|| 54|| 25.8|| .454|| .460|| .788|| 2.0|| 2.9|| 1.0|| 0.1||  12.8
|-
| align="left" | 2014-15
| align="left" | Toshiba
| 54|| || 28.2|| .435|| .399|| .881|| 1.9|| 2.3|| 1.2|| 0.1|| 14.1
|-
| align="left" | 2015-16
| align="left" | Toshiba
| 52|| || 28.7|| .428|| .415|| .863|| 2.1|| 2.9|| 0.7|| 0.1||  12.2
|-
| align="left" |  2016-17
| align="left" | Kawasaki
| || || || || || || || || || ||
|-
|}

References

External links
 Naoto TSUJI at the 2016 FIBA Olympic Qualifying Tournament
 Asia-basket.com Profile
8 3pointers on a day
Dinner show

1989 births
Living people
Japanese men's basketball players
Sportspeople from Osaka Prefecture
Kawasaki Brave Thunders players
Point guards
Asian Games medalists in basketball
Basketball players at the 2014 Asian Games
Asian Games bronze medalists for Japan
Medalists at the 2014 Asian Games
Basketball players at the 2018 Asian Games
People from Habikino